Wilhelm Banse (18 April 1911 – 16 April 1965) was a German politician of the Social Democratic Party (SPD) and former member of the German Bundestag.

Life 
Banse was a member of the Wetzlar district council from 1948 to 1951 and was elected to the Offenbach district in May 1952. He was a member of the German Bundestag from 1953 to 1957. In parliament he represented the direct mandate of the Offenbach district of the Bundestag.

Literature

References

1911 births
1965 deaths
Members of the Bundestag for Hesse
Members of the Bundestag 1953–1957
Members of the Bundestag for the Social Democratic Party of Germany